Yasutoshi is a masculine Japanese given name.

Possible writings
Yasutoshi can be written using many different combinations of kanji characters. Here are some examples:

靖敏, "peaceful, agile"
靖俊, "peaceful, talented"
靖利, "peaceful, benefit"
靖寿, "peaceful, long life"
靖年, "peaceful, year"
康敏, "healthy, agile"
康俊, "healthy, talented"
康利, "healthy, benefit"
康寿, "healthy, long life"
康年, "healthy, year"
安敏, "tranquil, agile"
安俊, "tranquil, talented"
保敏, "preserve, agile"
保俊, "preserve, talented"
保利, "preserve, benefit"
泰敏, "peaceful, agile"
泰俊, "peaceful, talented"
泰年, "peaceful, year"
易利, "divination, benefit"

The name can also be written in hiragana やすとし or katakana ヤストシ.

Notable people with the name
Yasutoshi Honda (本多 康俊, 1569–1621), Japanese samurai and daimyō
 (born 1957), Japanese sport wrestler
, Japanese sport wrestler
 (born 1971), Japanese screenwriter
 (born 1962), Japanese politician
 (born 1971), Japanese sumo wrestler
 (born 1965), Japanese footballer

Japanese masculine given names